Myles McDonagh (10 April 1904 – 18 March 1975) was an Irish boxer. He competed at the 1924 Summer Olympics and the 1928 Summer Olympics. At the 1924 Summer Olympics he lost to Ruperto Biete of Spain.

References

External links
 

1904 births
1975 deaths
Irish male boxers
Olympic boxers of Ireland
Boxers at the 1924 Summer Olympics
Boxers at the 1928 Summer Olympics
Place of birth missing
Flyweight boxers